Oxyloma patentissima is a species of land snail, a terrestrial pulmonate gastropod mollusk in the family Succineidae, the amber snails.

Distribution
The distribution of Oxyloma patentissima includes:
 Lake Chad
 Angola
 Botswana
 Zimbabwe, lake Chivero
 southern Mozambique
 South Africa

Description
The width of the shell is 5.1-5.3 mm; the height of the shell is 8.9-10.4 mm.

Ecology
Oxyloma patentissima lives only in very wet habitats. It is an amphibious species living around freshwater habitats such as streams and lakes, and also in mangroves. This species can also be ecologically considered as a freshwater snail.

References

External links
 Wright C. A. (1963). "The freshwater gastropod mollusca of Angola". Bulletin of the British Museum (Natural History) 10(8): 447-528. 16 plates. page 500.

Succineidae
Gastropods described in 1853